Wichita Dwight D. Eisenhower National Airport  is a commercial airport  west of downtown Wichita, Kansas, United States. It is the largest and busiest airport in the state of Kansas. Located south of US-54 in southwest Wichita, it covers 3,248 acres (1,314 ha) and contains three runways.

The airport is referred to as Eisenhower National Airport or by its former name Mid-Continent Airport. The airport's airport code, ICT, is also a nickname for the city.

The airport was previously Wichita Mid-Continent Airport. The name was to be changed on March 31, 2015 by the city of Wichita, but the official change occurred within the Federal Aviation Administration (FAA) on November 13, 2014 for a deadline to publish new aeronautical charts and airport directories. The new terminal opened on Wednesday, June 3, 2015.

Wichita Dwight D. Eisenhower Airport offers flights on seven major airlines. Destinations include: Denver, Seattle, Los Angeles, Orlando, Atlanta, Minneapolis, Houston, Dallas, Chicago, Las Vegas, Destin, Phoenix, St. Louis.

The airport is named after Dwight Eisenhower, the 34th President of the United States from 1953 to 1961. His boyhood home, museum, and Presidential Library are at the Eisenhower Presidential Center in Abilene, Kansas.

The airport is the site of the Cessna headquarters and main manufacturing plant, as well as a Bombardier service center for Learjet and other business jet aircraft.

History
Since 1924, the largest airport in Wichita has had three major terminals, including the moving of its location from the southeast to southwest side of the city.

Wichita Municipal Airport
In October 1924, the city of Wichita hosted more than 100,000 people for the National Air Congress. The event was used by city planners to raise funds for a proposed Wichita Municipal Airport. The event was a success and ground-breaking ceremonies for the airport were held on June 28, 1929. Wichita Municipal Airport was officially dedicated on March 31, 1935.

In August 1941, during World War II, the Kansas National Guard 127th Observation Squadron was activated as the first military unit assigned to the Wichita airport.

By the summer of 1950, Boeing was ready to turn out the first production B-47 Stratojets and the United States Air Force sought to make Wichita Airport a permanent military installation. Public hearings began to consider locating an Air Force base near the Wichita Boeing facilities, and the city of Wichita was awarded $9.4 million to build a new airfield for its own use.

On May 31, 1951 the USAF took title to the airport. Civil and military flights shared the airport until the new city airport was completed in October 1954. The Wichita Municipal Airport was renamed Wichita Air Force Base, then renamed again to its current name of McConnell Air Force Base.

The original terminal was eventually acquired by the City of Wichita in 1980. Volunteers entered the building in the late 1980s with wheelbarrows and shovels and began the arduous cleaning task. It was named the Kansas Aviation Museum and opened on April 19, 1991 to showcase Kansas aviation history.

Wichita Mid-Continent Airport
In 1951 the United States Air Force brought proceedings to condemn and acquire the Wichita Municipal Airport for what was to become McConnell Air Force Base.  Wichita's park board quickly acquired  of land in southwest Wichita and the construction of a new "Wichita Municipal Airport" took about three and a half years. The Airport opened to general aviation traffic in 1953 and airline flights moved to the new airport on April 1, 1954. The new airport was dedicated on October 31, 1954 with two runways and became Wichita Mid-Continent Airport in 1973 after Kansas City renamed its Mid-Continent Airport to Kansas City International Airport.

The airport's ICT designation is an abbreviation for Wichita.  At the time the FCC prohibited airport codes starting with "K" or "W."  Naming conventions of the time then called for the second letter of the city to be used and then use any phonetics to make it easier to identify.  Similarly, Kansas City could not get a KCI designation when it renamed its Mid-Continent International Airport to Kansas City International Airport in 1972 (so Kansas City still has MCI as its designation). IATA is reluctant to change designations once they appear on maps.

The April 1957 Official Airline Guide shows 11 weekday departures on Braniff, 10 TWA, 4 Continental, 3 Central and 2 Ozark. Nonstop flights did not reach beyond Denver, Amarillo, Oklahoma City and Kansas City. In 1964 TWA had the first scheduled jet flights.

Two concourses attached to the terminal building with 10 gates were built in 1976. The ticketing areas were renovated and two gates were added in 1985.  A $6 million renovation of the terminal was completed in 1989.

Since 1991 the airfield has also hosted the Bombardier Aerospace Flight Test Centre (BFTC, former Learjet facility)

On September 13, 2012 groundbreaking ceremonies were held for a new terminal building.

Old Terminal
The Old Terminal had an East & West Concourse, each with six gates. The Old Terminal and East & West Concourses closed for good on the night of June 2, 2015, and have been demolished.

East Concourse gates: 1 - 6

Airlines: Allegiant Air (6), American Airlines/American Eagle (5), Delta Air Lines/Delta Connection (1 & 2)

Former airlines: America West, Continental, Frontier (Current), Northwest, Seaport Airlines, TWA, Vanguard & Western Pacific

West Concourse Gates: 7 - 12

Airlines: Southwest Airlines (12) & United Airlines/United Express (8 & 10)

Former airlines: Air Midwest, AirTran, Braniff (Original), Frontier (Original), Republic Airlines (Original), Western Airlines & USAir Express (later US Airways Express)

Notes: Gates 3, 4, 7, 9 & 11 were vacant/unused in 2015. Gate 9 was unused for many years and had been converted into a cocktail lounge.  Gate 11 was last used by Delta Air Lines/Delta Connection until they merged with Northwest Airlines and moved to the East Concourse in February 2010, this Gate was then converted to other use. Also in 2015, when the terminal closed, only gates 1, 2, 5, 6, 8, 10 & 12 had boarding bridges.

Wichita Dwight D. Eisenhower National Airport
On March 4, 2014 the Wichita City Council approved changing the name from Wichita Mid-Continent Airport to Wichita Dwight D. Eisenhower National Airport, in honor of former president, general, and Kansas native Dwight D. Eisenhower.

New Terminal
Groundbreaking ceremonies for the new terminal took place on September 13, 2012.  Construction started on October 9, 2012. The new terminal opened on June 3, 2015. The previous terminal has been demolished, as the new terminal became fully operational.

The new terminal is just west of the previous terminal. The two-story, . terminal, designed by HNTB, is a modern architectural design expressing Wichita's prominent position in the aviation industry.  Other contractors included AECOM, providing project management services, and Key/Walbridge Joint Venture, serving as the general contractor.  Aviation themed exhibits are part of the terminal's design.
Major elements include:

 New terminal roadway and covered curb with separate lanes for private and commercial vehicles.
 Terminal building with enlarged ticketing and baggage claim on the main entry level.
 Upper level concourse with departure lounges, concessions and expanded passenger security screening.
 12 boarding gates, each with a boarding bridge. Up to 16 boarding bridges total.
 Original tenant airlines; American Airlines, Delta Air Lines, Southwest Airlines and United Airlines each leased two gates. Allegiant Air leased one gate.
 Baggage handling systems with inline explosives detection security screening.
 Enhanced pre-security and post-security concessions and passenger services.
 Consolidated rental car facility counters, plus close-in parking and car return located in the covered garage.
 Covered daily, short and long term parking in a multi-level garage directly across from the new terminal.
 Short-term and long-term public parking plus a new expanded Park & Ride shuttle parking lot.
 Parking with at least 3,000 spaces.
 New communications, life safety and security systems.
 New aircraft apron for the new terminal and gates.
 Free wifi

The New Terminal/Concourse opened on June 3, 2015. The airport has one terminal and one concourse with 12 gates, all with glass jetways that can accommodate most current commercial aircraft.

Concourse Gates: 1–9; 11

Airlines: Alaska Airlines (11), Allegiant Air (3), American (6 & 7), Delta (1 & 2), Frontier (5), Southwest (4 & 5) & United (8 & 9)

Airlines and destinations

Passenger

Cargo

Statistics

Aviation activity

Top destinations

Airline market share

Accidents and incidents

On October 10, 2000, 2:52 PM, a Canadair Challenger CL-604 (CL-600-2B16) crashed during an experimental test flight.  The plane burst into flames on impact with part of the wreckage landing on Tyler Road along the west side of the airport.  Investigators say the crash was a result of pilot error and shifting fuel.  The pilot and flight test engineer were killed.  The copilot was seriously injured and died 36 days later.
On December 13, 2013, Terry Lee Loewen, an avionics technician, was arrested for attempting to bomb the airport. A Muslim-convert, he is alleged to have spent several months planning a suicide attack with a car-load of explosives.
On January 19, 2014, 12:30 AM, an Oklahoma man rammed his pickup truck through a security gate at the airport and was found waving documents at a small plane.
The building sustained serious damage, including the collapse of walls and a portion of the roof. The airplane had one person aboard it, the pilot, who died. Four people died, including three in the facility, and six were injured. See 2014 Wichita King Air crash for full details.

Nearby airports

Other airports in Wichita
 Colonel James Jabara Airport
 Beech Factory Airport
 Cessna Aircraft Field
 McConnell Air Force Base
 Westport Airport

Other airports in metro
 Augusta Municipal Airport
 Lloyd Stearman Field
Other airports in region
 List of airports in Kansas
 List of airports in Oklahoma

See also
 Greyhound Lines
 Wichita Transit

References

External links

 
 

 
Historical
 Photos of various Wichita airports, wichitaphotos.org

Airports in Kansas
Airports established in 1953
Economy of Wichita, Kansas
Transportation in Wichita, Kansas
Eisenhower
Buildings and structures in Wichita, Kansas